Wojęcino  is a village in the administrative district of Gmina Bobolice, within Koszalin County, West Pomeranian Voivodeship, in north-western Poland.

The village has a population of 90.

References

Villages in Koszalin County